Orallo might refer to:

 Orallo, Queensland, a locality in the Maranoa Region, Queensland, Australia
 Orallo, Villablino, a locality in Villablino municipality, Spain
 Orallo River, in Villablino municipality, Spain